The Shala Kazakh are a labelled group of Kazakhs who live in Kazakhstan. However, they do not belong to any of the three main Kazakh tribes.

The word Shala Kazakh has a second meaning in Kazakhstan. It means part of the Kazakh society who don't know their native language well or don't know it at all – the Kazakh language.

The actual translation for "shala" or "chala" is half. Thus, the whole meaning is "half Kazakh", i.e. the person who does not know and does not like his/her native language. The word is considered to be derogatory, shameful term for Kazakhs.

There is a main reason that so many Kazakh people don't know their language – due to the russification of all non-Slavic nations and minorities in the Soviet Union, many Kazakhs forgot their language. There are many young people who do not speak Kazakh in Kazakhstan today.

Sources
Wixman. The Peoples of the USSR. p. 42

Ethnic groups in Kazakhstan